All the Way Live is a compilation album released on June 21, 2000 by the Washington, D.C.-based go-go band Trouble Funk.

Track listing

"Full Blast Intro" – 1:45
"Who We Gonna Put on Display" – 2:51
"Mac Attack" – 0:55
"Left Handed Blunt" – 3:28
"Make it Mellow" – 4:55
"Fired Up" – 4:40
"Fall Down" – 5:49
"Pump It Up" – 4:03
"The Socket" – 1:49
"Doc's Groove" – 3:37
"Hit'em Wit da Super Grit" – 8:11
"Rock da Clock" – 5:39

Personnel

Mark Carey – percussion
Chester Davis – guitar
Tony Fisher – bass, vocals
Emmett Nixon – drums
Robert Reed – keyboards, vocals
Taylor Reed – trumpet
David Rudd – saxophone
Dennis "Fatz" Sterling – percussion

References

2000 compilation albums
Trouble Funk albums